MPVs are a planned Multi Purpose Vessel for the Indian Navy. Under the programme the Indian Navy intends to acquire two advanced ships. MPVs will be the first of its kind platform, constructed to provide a cost-effective solution to meet a variety of requirements of Indian Navy. These vessels, to be built by M/s L&T (Larsen & Toubro) shipyard at Kattupally (Chennai), will perform multi-role support functions such as maritime surveillance and patrol, launching and recovery of torpedoes, and operation of various types of aerial, surface and underwater targets for Gunnery/ASW firing exercises. These vessels would also be capable of towing ships and rendering humanitarian assistance and disaster relief (HADR) support with limited hospital ship capability. The ship will also act as trial platform for naval weapons and sensors under development, support platform for ISV & salvage operations, and to provide logistics support for India island territories.

References 

Indian Navy
Larsen & Toubro